Chertanovo is a railway station (or more precisely, platform, following the Russian railway stops classification) of the Paveletsky suburban railway line in the southern part of Moscow. It was opened in 1936 and named after a nearby village, which is now a residential area in the Southern Administrative Okrug of the city.

The station has two side platforms, connected by a pedestrian level crossing. There is a waiting shelter on the Moscow-bound platform.

References

Railway stations in Moscow
Railway stations of Moscow Railway
Travel